Tolchin is a surname derived from the name of the town of Tulchin, Ukraine.

Notable people with this surname include:
 Jonah Tolchin, American musician
 Martin Tolchin (1928–2022), American journalist
 Susan Tolchin (1941–2016), American political scientist

References